Epipyrops fuliginosa is a moth in the Epipyropidae family. It was described by Tams in 1922. It is found in India.

References

Moths described in 1922
Epipyropidae